The 1997 Estoril Open was a tennis tournament played on outdoor clay courts. This event was the 8th edition of the Estoril Open, included in the 1997 ATP Tour World Series. The event took place at the Estoril Court Central, in Oeiras, Portugal, from April 7 through April 14, 1997.

Finals

Singles

 Àlex Corretja defeated  Francisco Clavet, 6–3, 7–5
It was Corretja's 1st title of the year and 2nd of his career.

Doubles

 Gustavo Kuerten /  Fernando Meligeni defeated  Andrea Gaudenzi /  Filippo Messori, 6–2, 6–2
It was Kuerten's and Meligeni's 1st title of the year and 2nd of their careers.

References

1997
Estoril
Estoril Open
 Estoril Open